Martin Nelson Ransohoff (July 7, 1927 – December 13, 2017) was an American film and television producer, and member of the Ransohoff family.

Early life and education
Ransohoff was born on July 7, 1927, in New Orleans, Louisiana the son of Babette (Strauss) and Arthur Ransohoff. His mother was a former Republican National Committeewoman. He had one sister Barbara Burnett (married to a former Washington & Jefferson College president Howard J. Burnett) and one brother Jack, a nuclear engineer. He attended Wooster School in Danbury, Connecticut and graduated with a B.A. in History and English from Colgate University in 1948.

Career

After school Ransohoff worked at several jobs (peddling housewares door-to-door, selling autos, and working at an advertising agency), before joining Caravel Films (later Transfilm-Caravel) in 1950 in New York City, where he worked as a salesman, writer, and producer.

Filmways
In 1952, Ransohoff co-founded the film production company Filmways, Inc. with Edwin Kasper (Kasper left the firm in 1957).
The firm listed on the New York Stock Exchange in 1959. Filmways started making TV commercials, moved into documentaries, then sitcoms; by 1963 Filmways was making $13 million a year. Mister Ed and The Beverly Hillbillies brought Ransohoff his first successes in 1960 and 1962. Thereafter he turned his attention to films.

MGM
Ransohoff's first film as producer was Boys' Night Out (1962) starring James Garner and Kim Novak and distributed by MGM. Garner was also in Ransohoff's next two films, both of which were directed by Arthur Hiller: The Wheeler Dealers (1963) and The Americanization of Emily (1964); the latter, based on a script by Paddy Chayefsky, was particularly praised.

Ransohoff found commercial success with The Sandpiper (1965), based on a story by the producer and starring Richard Burton and Elizabeth Taylor. He produced The Cincinnati Kid (1965), firing Sam Peckinpah as director during filming and replacing him with Norman Jewison; the movie received strong reviews. Less popular was The Loved One (1965). Eye of the Devil (1967) was a thriller originally starring Kim Novak, David Niven, and a young actor Ransohoff put under personal contract, Sharon Tate. Novak was injured during filming and was replaced by Deborah Kerr. Tate was in Ransohoff's next films, The Fearless Vampire Killers (1967), directed by Roman Polanski, whom she would marry (Ransohoff was executive producer), and Don't Make Waves (1967). He executive produced Our Mother's House (1967) in England and produced Ice Station Zebra (1968).

Post-MGM
Ransohoff then signed a deal with Columbia, who distributed his A Midsummer Night's Dream (1968), Castle Keep (1969), and Hamlet (1969). He made Catch-22 (1970) at Paramount, The Moonshine War (1970) at MGM, and 10 Rillington Place (1971) and See No Evil (1971) at Columbia. King Lear (1971) was released by a smaller company. He also made Fuzz (1972) and Save the Tiger (1973). His last film for Filmways was The White Dawn (1974).

Post-Filmways
In 1972 Ransohoff became an independent producer. He signed a contract with Paramount to make movies for them. Ransohoff went on to produce such films as Silver Streak (1976), Nightwing (1979), and The Wanderers (1979). He made a short lived TV series Co-Ed Fever (1979) but focused on features: A Change of Seasons (1980), American Pop (1981), Hanky Panky (1982), and Class (1983).

Columbia and later films
Ransohoff had success with Jagged Edge (1985) based on a script for Joe Eszterhas. It was made by Columbia who also distributed Ransohoff's The Big Town (1987), Switching Channels (1988), Physical Evidence (1989), and Welcome Home (1989). It was around that time that his company Albacore Productions had inked pacts with Columbia Pictures, which covered domestic theatrical distribution, British film distributor Rank Film Distributors, which covered international distribution and Vestron Video, which covered home video distribution for a three-film agreement. Ransohoff's later films included Guilty as Sin (1993) and Turbulence (1997).

Personal life
Ransohoff was married twice. His first wife was Nancy Hope Lundgren; they had four children Peter (born 1952), Karen (born 1954), and twins Steven and Kurt (born 1957). His second wife was Joan Marie Ransohoff, an artist. Ransohoff died on December 13, 2017, at his Bel Air home in Los Angeles. He was 90.

Selected filmography

Boys' Night Out (1962) – producer
The Beverly Hillbillies (1962–71) (TV series) – executive producer
The Wheeler Dealers (1963) – producer
The Americanization of Emily (1964) – producer
Topkapi (1964) – producer
The Sandpiper (1965) – story, producer
The Cincinnati Kid (1965) – producer
The Loved One (1965) – executive producer (uncredited)
Eye of the Devil (1967) – producer
The Fearless Vampire Killers (1967) – executive producer
Don't Make Waves (1967) – producer
Our Mother's House (1967) – executive producer
Ice Station Zebra (1968) – producer
A Midsummer Night's Dream (1968) – executive producer
Castle Keep (1969) – producer
Hamlet (1969) – producer
Catch-22 (1970) – producer
The Moonshine War (1970) – producer
10 Rillington Place (1971) – producer
See No Evil (1971) – producer
King Lear (1971) – producer
What's the Matter with Helen? (1971) – presenter
Fuzz (1972) – producer
Save the Tiger (1973) – producer
The White Dawn (1974) – story, producer
Silver Streak (1976) – executive producer
Nightwing (1979) – producer
The Wanderers (1979) – producer
Co-Ed Fever (1979) (TV series) – executive producer
A Change of Seasons (1980) – story, producer
American Pop (1981) – producer
Hanky Panky (1982) – producer
Class (1983) – producer
Jagged Edge (1985) – producer
The Big Town (1987) – producer
Switching Channels (1988) – producer
Physical Evidence (1989) – producer
Welcome Home (1989) – producer
Guilty as Sin (1993) – producer
Turbulence (1997) – producer

See also 
Ransohoff family

References

External links

1927 births
2017 deaths
People from New Orleans
Colgate University alumni
Film producers from New York (state)
Television producers from New York (state)
Film producers from Louisiana
Filmways